Corn Meal Dance is an album by American jazz bassist and composer William Parker's Raining on the Moon, which was recorded in 2007 and released on the AUM Fidelity label.

Reception

The review for AllMusic stated "These evocative, vocal-based tracks may seem surprising to those used to Parker's usual fare, but one listen through Corn Meal Dance will  the suspicious". All About Jazz said "Corn Meal Dance is another great recording from an artist whose talent seems to have no limits".

Other reviewers were more reserved. PopMatters's review observed "Corn Meal Dance is hardly the best of William Parker, but as yet another facet of his considerable jazz spectrum it is a graceful expansion of territory.  Whether it is for the jazz content, the politics, or the accessible jazz-soul grooves, this latest release for the outstanding jazz bassist is a strong effort". The JazzTimes review noted "the album would’ve benefited had the stronger performances in the middle and at the end been brought to the fore".

Track listing
All compositions by William Parker except as indicated
 "Doctor Yesterday" – 8:45
 "Tutsi Orphans" – 7:17
 "Poem for June Jordan" – 3:04
 "Soledad" – 9:57
 "Corn Meal Dance" – 9:02
 "Land Song" – 11:40
 "Prayer" – 3:58
 "Old Tears" (Parker, Leena Conquest) – 8:41
 "Gilmore's Hat" – 7:16

Personnel
William Parker – bass
Leena Conquest – vocals
Louis Barnes – trumpet
Rob Brown – alto saxophone
Eri Yamamoto – piano 
Hamid Drake – drums

References

2007 albums
AUM Fidelity albums
William Parker (musician) albums